Ulysses Sigel Webb (September 29, 1864 – July 31, 1947) was an American lawyer and politician affiliated with the Republican Party. He served as the 19th Attorney General of California for the lengthy span of 37 years.

Webb's parents were Cyrus Webb, a Civil War captain, and Eliza Cather Webb. He was born in West Virginia and educated in Kansas, and later moved to Quincy, California. There, he gained admittance to the State Bar of California and was elected Plumas County District Attorney, in which position he served for 12 years (1890–1902).

He was appointed Attorney General of California by Governor Henry Gage in 1902, and elected to a full term later that year. Webb served as attorney general for 37 years, from 1902 to 1939 (9 terms), and is one of the longest-serving statewide officials in American history. He began a lengthy series of lawsuits to prove the state held title, in trust for the people of California, to tide and submerged lands, for public access and use for navigation, shipping and commerce. His administration served to clarify new legislation involving elections, motor vehicles, and criminal trial procedures. (The Criminal Law Division has since exploded its workload—Webb reported in his 1914–16 Biennial Report a criminal case load of 307 appeals in two years, whereas today more than 6,000 appeals are received annually).

Webb also vigorously prosecuted land transfers made to avoid enforcement of the California Alien Land Law of 1913 that prohibited ownership of land in California by Chinese, Japanese, and other Asians who were ineligible for naturalized citizenship. In the 1930s, Webb's office pressured Fish and Game authorities to go after aliens with commercial fishermen's licenses and prevent offloading of fish at the port of San Diego.

On September 18, 1934, Judge C.N. Andrews ruled that residence requirements were a violation of the equal protection clause of the Fourteenth Amendment to the U.S. Constitution. Webb appealed to the Court of Appeals and the state Supreme Court, both of which also ruled that residence requirements violated the Fourteenth Amendment.

California governor Gray Davis apologized in 2003 for Webb's zealous progressive-promoted sterilization program under the state's eugenics policy.

Personal life

Webb married Grace Goodwin, the daughter of Judge J. D. and Martha Goodwin of Quincy. The Webbs had three children, Hester, Sigel Goodwin and Grace. Webb belonged to the Masonic and Knights of Pythias fraternities and to the Union League Club. He died in San Francisco on July 31, 1947.

References

External links
Ulysses S. Webb, 19th Attorney General - 1850 to Present - California Dept. of Justice - Office of the Attorney General at caag.state.ca.us
JoinCalifornia - U. S. Webb at www.joincalifornia.com
Keith Aoki, No Right to Own? The Early Twentieth-Century "Alien Land Laws" as a Prelude to Internment, 19 Boston College Third World Law Journal 37 (1998)
Rose Cuison Villazor, Rediscovering Oyama v. California: At the Intersection of Property, Race and Citizenship, 87 Washington University Law Review 979 (2010) 
Dudley O. McGovney, The Anti-Japanese Land Laws of California and Ten Other States, 35 California Law Review 7 (1947).

1864 births
1947 deaths
California Attorneys General
California Republicans
People from Quincy, California
People from Taylor County, West Virginia